Mânăstirea is a commune in Călărași County, Muntenia, Romania. It is composed of three villages: Coconi, Mânăstirea, and Sultana.

As of 2011, the population of Mânăstirea was 5,612.

Natives
 Alexandru Sahia

References

Communes in Călărași County
Localities in Muntenia